The Canadian Screen Award for Best Reality/Competition Series is an annual Canadian television award, presented by the Academy of Canadian Cinema and Television to the best Canadian reality television series. Previously presented as part of the Gemini Awards, since 2013 it has been presented as part of the Canadian Screen Awards.

The award was originally presented as Best Reality Program or Series, and did not necessarily require nominated or winning shows to be competitive in nature. As other awards were introduced for categories such as lifestyle, factual and history programming, the reality category's focus narrowed in more strongly on competition shows.

2000s

2010s

2020s

References

Reality Series